Vladimir Filippov may refer to:
 Vladimir Filippov (architect) (born 1950), Russian architect
 Vladimir Filippov (politician) (born 1951), Russian academic and former Minister of Education
 Vladimir Filippov (footballer) (born 1968), Russian footballer
 Vladimir Filippov (basketball), Russian basketball player